= International cricket in 1893–94 =

International cricket season

The 1893–94 international cricket season was from September 1893 to April 1894. The season consisted of a single international tour where the New South Wales cricket team toured New Zealand for a first-class series.

== Season overview ==
International tours
Start date	Home team	Away team	Results [Matches]			
Start date	Home team	Away team	Test	ODI	FC	LA
15 February 1894	New Zealand	New South Wales	—	—	0–1 [1]	—
